Musicarnival was a music "tent" theater on Warrensville Center Rd. in Warrensville Heights, among the first of its kind. The theater was expanded in 1958 from its initial seating capacity, growing from 1,500 to 2,563. The theater was used for performances of musicals, operettas and operas, and also hosted a number of famous musicians and rock bands, such as  the Mothers of Invention, Duke Ellington, Stan Kenton, Dave Brubeck, The Who and Led Zeppelin.

Musicarnival closed in August 1975.

References

External links
Musicarnival Archives at Cleveland Public Library's Digital Gallery (online)
Guide to the John L. Price, Jr. Musicarnival archive at Cleveland Public Library
Guide to the Lt. Col. Robert "Jim" Price Musicarnival Audio Archive at Cleveland Public Library Special Collections

Former music venues in the United States
1954 establishments in Ohio
1975 disestablishments in Ohio
Music venues in Cleveland